Elizabeth Gutiérrez Nevárez (born April 1, 1979) is an American actress and model of Mexican descent. She is best known for playing the leading roles in the telenovelas El Rostro de Analía and El fantasma de Elena.

Background
Gutiérrez was born in Los Angeles, California, to Mexican parents.

While working on Protagonistas de Novela, she began an on-off relationship with fellow contestant William Levy. Their relationship has been on-again, off-again since at least 2003. She gave birth to their son, Christopher Alexander, in 2006, and to their daughter, Kailey Alexandra, on March 6, 2010.

Career

Gutiérrez had early work as a model on The Price Is Right. She participated in the second season of the reality show Protagonistas de Novela.

Gutiérrez began her work in telenovelas in 2005, playing the villain Isabela in Venevision International's Olvidarte jamás. She left the production 12 episodes before its end due to her first pregnancy. The next year she began playing Paola in Acorralada but left to take the lead role in Amor comprado. In 2007, she played the lead role in Isla paraíso, a mininovela of 15 two-minute episodes produced by Venevisión and published online.

In 2008, she took another female lead role, this time in the Telemundo telenovela El Rostro de Analía. The telenovela was broadcast in more than 50 countries; being on one of Telemundo's most popular telenovelas brought Gutiérrez worldwide recognition. In 2009, she turned down the role of Priscila on Bella calamidades to play a villain in the fifth remake of Corazón salvaje. Critics responded favorably to Gutiérrez's performance.

She went on to play the lead in El fantasma de Elena, her third leading role. This telenovela was not as popular as expected in the United States but was more successful elsewhere. It has been sold in 70 countries. She filmed the pilot episode for La Mala, La Buena y La Tonta but left the project in favor of El fantasma de Elena. She also appeared on the Univision reality show Mira quién baila on Univision. In 2012 she accepted the role of Mariana San Lucas, who swung between a father and a son, in El rostro de la venganza, from which telenovela she left early in its presentation.

Filmography

References

External links

1979 births
Actresses from Los Angeles
American actresses of Mexican descent
American telenovela actresses
American television actresses
Female models from California
Hispanic and Latino American actresses
Living people
21st-century American women